Banham may refer to:

 Banham (surname)
 Banham, Norfolk
 Banham Conversions
 Banham Poultry
 Banham Zoo
 Banham Patent Locks

See also
 Local Government Commission for England (1992), also known as the Banham Review
 Reddaway v. Banham